Tijmen van der Helm (born 26 January 2004) is a Dutch racing driver currently competing in the 2023 European Le Mans Series with Panis Racing.

Personal life 
Van Der Helm was born on 26 January 2004 in Delft, and grew up in nearby Den Hoorn, South Holland. His career was influenced by his father Gerald, who raced in the Dutch Volkswagen Endurance Cup.

Early career

Karting 
Having started karting in 2013, Van Der Helm's notable karting successes include third place in the 2013 Chrono Karting Winter Series - Micromax, second in the 2017 CIK-FIA Karting Academy Trophy and a victory in the 2017 Rotax Max Challenge Grand Finals in the junior category.

Lower formulae 
Van Der Helm made his single seater debut in the 2019 Formula 4 UAE Championship with Xcel Motorsport. He finished the series 10th in the standings with a win and 3 podiums to his name. Later that year he would race in the 2019 Spanish F4 Championship with MP Motorsport. The Dutchman took 8 podiums on his way to 4th in the points. In 2020 Tijmen raced in the 2020 Toyota Racing Series. Participating in the championship with Kiwi Motorsport. He finished 14th in the Drivers Championship with a race victory.

Formula Renault Eurocup 
In 2020 Van Der Helm would race in the Formula Renault Eurocup with FA Racing. He ended the season 12th in the points tally, with one podium finish and 45 points. Van Der Helm also beat his experienced teammate Amaury Cordeel by two positions in the championship, and was the sixth-best rookie in the rookie standings.

FIA Formula 3 

On February 12, Van Der Helm was announced as a MP Motorsport driver for the 2021 season, partnering Alpine juniors and Formula Renault rivals Caio Collet and Victor Martins. During most of the season the Dutchman was considerably behind his teammates in the races, scoring no points and only rarely managing to beat Collet and Martins in races.

Sportscar career

2022: Rookie season in LMP2
After the Dutchman had made his endurance racing debut in the 24 Hours of Daytona at the start of 2022, it was announced that ARC Bratislava team had signed Van der Helm for the FIA World Endurance Championship campaign, where he would partner Mathias Beche and Miro Konôpka. He competed for the team in three of the first four rounds, having finished fourth as part of the TDS Racing lineup at the 24 Hours of Le Mans, before ARC Bratislava withdrew from the series, citing logistical reasons.

During the same year, Van der Helm also took part in the European Le Mans Series, driving for TDS Racing x Vaillante alongside Beche and Philippe Cimadomo. Having competed in the Pro-Am category given Cimadomo's status as a bronze driver, the team ended up fourth in the class standings, whilst two best race finishes of tenth in the opening pair of races took Van der Helm to 22nd in the overall drivers' championship.

2023 
Van der Helm started 2023 by stepping down to the LMP3 class, where he finished fifth in the 24 Hours of Daytona for JDC-Miller Motorsports, having experienced a number of technical issues. Shortly afterwards, it was announced that he would partner Job van Uitert and Manuel Maldonado in the European Le Mans Series, returning to the LMP2 class with Panis Racing.

Karting record

Karting career summary

Complete Karting World Championship results

Racing record

Racing career summary 

† As van der Helm was a guest driver, he was ineligible to score points.
* Season still in progress.

Complete F4 Spanish Championship results 
(key) (Races in bold indicate pole position) (Races in italics indicate fastest lap)

Complete Toyota Racing Series results 
(key) (Races in bold indicate pole position) (Races in italics indicate fastest lap)

Complete Formula Renault Eurocup results 
(key) (Races in bold indicate pole position) (Races in italics indicate fastest lap)

Complete FIA Formula 3 Championship results 
(key) (Races in bold indicate pole position; races in italics indicate points for the fastest lap of top ten finishers)

† Driver did not finish the race, but was classified as they completed more than 90% of the race distance.

Complete IMSA SportsCar Championship results 
(key) (Races in bold indicate pole position; races in italics indicate fastest lap)

† Points only counted towards the Michelin Endurance Cup, and not the overall LMP2 Championship.
* Season still in progress.

Complete FIA World Endurance Championship results 
(key) (Races in bold indicate pole position) (Races in italics indicate fastest lap)

† Non World Endurance Championship entries are ineligible to score points.
* Season still in progress.

Complete European Le Mans Series results 
(key) (Races in bold indicate pole position; results in italics indicate fastest lap)

Complete 24 Hours of Le Mans results

References

External links
 

2004 births
Living people
Dutch racing drivers
Spanish F4 Championship drivers
Formula Renault Eurocup drivers
FIA Formula 3 Championship drivers
MP Motorsport drivers
FA Racing drivers
24 Hours of Le Mans drivers
G-Drive Racing drivers
TDS Racing drivers
WeatherTech SportsCar Championship drivers
European Le Mans Series drivers
Karting World Championship drivers
Drivex drivers
UAE F4 Championship drivers
Le Mans Cup drivers
JDC Motorsports drivers